Poulett is a surname and given name. Notable people with the name include:

Surname
 Anne Poulett (1711–1785), fourth son of John Poulett, 1st Earl Poulett, was a British Member of Parliament
 George Poulett, 8th Earl Poulett (1909–1973), English peer, landowner, and a member of the House of Lord
 John Poulett (disambiguation), multiple people, including:
John Poulett, 1st Baron Poulett, (1585–1649), English sailor and politician who sat in the House of Commons
John Poulett, 2nd Baron Poulett, (1615–1665), English peer and Member of Parliament
John Poulett, 3rd Baron Poulett (c. 1641 – 1679), English peer
John Poulett, 1st Earl Poulett (1663–1743), English peer, the son of John Poulett, 3rd Baron Poulett
John Poulett, 2nd Earl Poulett (1708–1764), English peer, known as Viscount Hinton from birth until 1743
John Poulett, 4th Earl Poulett (1756–1819), English peer and militia officer
John Poulett, 5th Earl Poulett (1783–1864), English peer and militia officer
 Vere Poulett (1761–1812), British soldier and politician
 Vere Poulett, 3rd Earl Poulett (1710–1788), English peer
 William Poulett (disambiguation), multiple people, including:
William Poulett, 6th Earl Poulett (1827–1899), English peer, landowner, army officer, and racehorse owner
William Poulett, 7th Earl Poulett (1883–1918), English peer and British Army officer

Given name
 Poulett Somerset CB (1822–1875), British soldier and politician

See also
 Earl Poulett, title in the Peerage of England
 Poulet
 Poulette (disambiguation)
 Poulett-Harris